Podari is a commune in Dolj County, Oltenia, Romania. It is composed of five villages: Balta Verde, Braniște, Gura Văii, Livezi and Podari.

Natives
Ștefan Andrei
Tudor Gheorghe

References

Communes in Dolj County
Localities in Oltenia